Vietglish or Vietlish, is an informal term for a mixture of elements from Vietglish.

The term Vietglish is first recorded in 1969. Other colloquial portmanteau words for Vietlish include (chronologically): Vietglish (1992), Vinish (2003), Vinglish (2010) and Vietnamiglish (2016).

This usage is said to be found in immigrant communities in majority-English-speaking countries. Borrowed English words are also commonly used in everyday Vietnamese both inside and outside Vietnam in informal contexts.

External links
Viet Voice Magazine - Very Vietglish
What are you speaking? Hey, it's just Vietglish

References

Vietnamese language
Macaronic language